Lac-Supérieur is a municipality in the Laurentides region of Quebec, Canada, part of the Les Laurentides Regional County Municipality. It is named after Lake Superior (Lac Supérieur) which is located in the Laurentian Mountains, due east of Mont Tremblant Resort. The community of Lac-Supérieur is just south of the lake, which itself is ringed with cottages. The entire northern portion of the municipality is mostly undeveloped and part of the Mont-Tremblant National Park.

History
The municipality was formed in 1881 and initially named Wolfe, in tribute to British General James Wolfe. Its first settlers were Canadians repatriated from California and the western United States.

In 1944, the municipality was renamed to Saint-Faustin, the name of the parish founded in 1878 in what is now part of Mont-Blanc. In 1957, it was renamed again to its present name, a designation previously assigned to the post office which opened in 1913.

Demographics
Population trend:
 Population in 2011: 1892 (2006 to 2011 population change: 8.4%)
 Population in 2006: 1745
 Population in 2001: 1439
 Population in 1996: 1199
 Population in 1991: 952

Private dwellings occupied by usual residents: 872 (total dwellings: 1654)

Mother tongue:
 English as first language: 4.5%
 French as first language: 95%
 English and French as first language: 0.5%
 Other as first language: 0%

Education

Sainte Agathe Academy (of the Sir Wilfrid Laurier School Board) in Sainte-Agathe-des-Monts serves English-speaking students in this community for both elementary and secondary levels.

References

External links
 

Municipalities in Quebec
Incorporated places in Laurentides